Hartley is a village and civil parish in the Sevenoaks district of Kent, England.

History
The village of Hartley is recorded as Erclei in the Domesday Book of 1086. with a population of 15 families and 3 slaves. The name Hartley means "place in the wood where the deer are". The parish church of All Saints dates from the early 12th century, although it probably replaced an earlier Anglo-Saxon building.

On 28 January 1554, during Wyatt's Rebellion against Queen Mary, a rebel force of about 500 men led by Henry Isley clashed with a similar-sized loyal force led by Lord Abergavenny and Sir Robert Southwell, at Wrotham Hill. After a running battle over about four miles, the rebels made their last stand at Hartley Wood, where they were defeated.

By 1872, there were 47 houses in Hartley with a population of 244. Some local farms specialised in hop growing. A National School was built in the village in 1841; it was rebuilt in 1960 on a new site.

The opening nearby of Longfield railway station in 1872 began the evolution of the village from an agricultural to a commuter community. Just before World War I, two agricultural estates were purchased by a property developer and sold off in small plots for new houses and bungalows. Major housing developments at New Ash Green in the 1960s and Wellfield in the 1970s continued the trend.

The parish was part of Axstane Hundred and later Dartford Rural District. It is part of the parliamentary constituency of Dartford.

Places of worship
All Saints Church, the Anglican parish church, is Grade I-listed and dates from the 12th century.  It is supplemented by the All Saints Church Centre in the centre of the village, which is used as a church hall and for worship.  St Francis de Sales' Roman Catholic church, a Grade II-listed building, is a 17th-century former barn with timber framing and a thatched roof.  Hartley United Reformed Church (formerly Congregational) was registered for worship in 1936 but has closed and was put up for sale, before being demolished and turned into housing.

Sports
Hartley Country Club cricket section were the Kent Cricket League Premier Champions in 2008, 2011-2013 and 2015.

The Pétanque section membership at Hartley Country Club currently numbers about ninety players, split equally between men and women.

Transport

Rail
Hartley is served by Longfield railway station with Southeastern services to London Victoria via Bromley South, Ramsagate via Chatham and Dover Priory via Chatham and Canterbury East.

Buses
Hartley is served by Arriva Kent Thameside routes 423, 433 and 489. These connect it with Bluewater, Dartford and Gravesend.

See also
 List of places of worship in Sevenoaks District

References

External links

 Local information and history website
 Hartley Parish Council
 The Parish of Fawkham and Hartley
 British Listed Buildings - Listed Buildings in Hartley, Kent, England

Villages in Kent
Civil parishes in Kent